Bruno Filipe Raposo Fernandes (born 11 January 1986 in Mira de Aire, Leiria District), known as Bruninho, is a Portuguese professional footballer who plays for Penya Encarnada d'Andorra as a winger.

References

External links

1986 births
Living people
Sportspeople from Leiria District
Portuguese footballers
Association football wingers
Liga Portugal 2 players
Segunda Divisão players
U.R. Mirense players
Sporting CP footballers
Casa Pia A.C. players
C.D. Aves players
AD Fafe players
A.D. Lousada players
Portimonense S.C. players
Louletano D.C. players
F.C. Tirsense players
F.C. Lixa players
Primera Divisió players
FC Lusitanos players
UE Sant Julià players
UE Engordany players
Inter Club d'Escaldes players
Portugal youth international footballers
Portuguese expatriate footballers
Expatriate footballers in Andorra
Portuguese expatriate sportspeople in Andorra